Immediate Records was a British record label, started in 1965 by The Rolling Stones' manager Andrew Loog Oldham and Tony Calder, and concentrating on the London-based blues and R&B scene.

History
Immediate Records was started in 1965.  Signed musicians included Rod Stewart, P.P. Arnold, songwriter Paul Korda, Billy Nicholls, John Mayall, Savoy Brown, Small Faces, The Nice, Fleetwood Mac, The Groundhogs, Chris Farlowe, Duncan Browne and Humble Pie.

Due to financial problems, the label ceased operations in 1970, and it has been the subject of controversy ever since. This is especially true in regard to unpaid royalties owed to the Small Faces, who made numerous hit recordings for the label between 1967 and 1969. Despite their success, the band received virtually no income from these often re-released records, until legal action finally secured payments from the present licencees in the early 2000s.

According to Small Faces drummer Kenney Jones, most of Immediate Records' assets and income were embezzled by one of the company's senior partners, who allegedly channelled the funds to offshore bank accounts. Paul Korda, who wrote songs such as "The Time Has Come" for P.P. Arnold, was never paid for work done for Immediate Records.

In the US, Immediate Records first set up a deal with MGM Records, who issued three singles (K-13530, K-13567, K-13600) as part of the regular MGM series using regular MGM labels with the Immediate logo on the side of the label. Then Immediate Records set up a short-lived deal with United Artists, who issued two singles using the Immediate moniker (E-1901, E-1902) before signing a deal with CBS to set up a new label series, which picked selective Immediate Records singles (using product codes with the ZS7 prefix) and albums (using Z12) until they had a dispute. Finally, Immediate Records set up a short-lived independent label in the US to issue one single (IMOC-001) and The Nice's last album before the label entered into liquidation.

In 2008, a comprehensive book about Immediate Records, written by Simon Spence, who 'ghosted' Andrew Loog Oldham's two autobiographies, was published in the UK and US by Black Dog as part of their Labels Unlimited series. A second, amended version has since been published. In 2016, a comprehensive discography with brief organisational history, The Immediate Discography: The First 20 Years by recorded music historian, Mark Jones, was published with input from Barry Green, the curator of the official Immediate archive. This book won the Association for Recorded Sound Collections, Best Research in Recorded Rock Music, Best Discography Award, 2017.

Today, Sanctuary Records, owned by BMG Rights Management, controls the Immediate Records catalogue in the United Kingdom.  Outside of the UK, Charly Records controls the Immediate catalogue. Charly owns the Immediate Records trade mark.

Discography

Albums

Singles

See also
 List of record labels: I–Q

References

External links
 The official Immediate Records website

British record labels
Record labels established in 1965
Record labels disestablished in 1970
Blues record labels
Pop record labels
Rhythm and blues record labels
 
 
Defunct record labels of the United Kingdom